Timelapse is an Australian sci-fi drama television series which first screened on the ABC in 1980.

Cast
 Robert Coleby as Douglas Hardy
 John Meillon as Premier Dakin
 Vincent Ball as Boyd Mackiel
 Kate Sheil as Angela Parker
 Tony Barry as Inspector Warren
 Anne Charleston as Dell
 Kerry Francis as Dr. Fallon
 Stephen Griffiths as Martin
 Matthew McGrath as Sandy

Synopsis
Set in 1991, it centres around Douglas Hardy, a computer genius who is cryogenically frozen by corrupt politicians after being murdered in 1979. Hardy returns to seek his revenge and bring down the now fascist, or more accurately, Authoritarian state government of New South Wales.
The ending subverts everything you thought you knew about the Premier, with the protagonist making a surprising choice and ending with the threat of nuclear Armageddon.

References

External links
Timelapse at Australian Television Information Archive

Australian Broadcasting Corporation original programming
1980 Australian television series debuts
1980 Australian television series endings
Australian drama television series
English-language television shows
Australian science fiction television series